Captain Sabertooth and the Magic Diamond is a 2019 Norwegian 3D computer-animated swashbuckler comedy film directed by Rasmus A. Sivertsen and  (in his directorial debut) from a screenplay by Karsten Fullu. Based on the Captain Sabertooth media franchise, the film's script is based on a 1996 Sabertooth play by Terje Formoe. It is produced by Sivertsen's Qvisten Animation, and was released in Norway on 27 September 2019.

Voice cast 
 as Captain Sabertooth
Tobias Santelmann as Langemann
Trond Fausa Aurvåg as Benjamin
 as Maga Kahn
Åge Sten Nilsen provides his singing voice
Charlotte Frogner as Sirikit, Maga Khan's Queen
Laila Goody as Aunt Bassa
Jan Martin Johnsen as Tully
Siri Skjeggedal as Sunniva
Leonard Valestrand Eike as Pinky
Ida Valestrand Eike as Marco
Jon Øigarden as Baltazar
 as Parrot

Release 
Captain Sabertooth and the Magic Diamond was released in Norway on 27 September 2019 by Nordic Film Distribution, and grossed $915,225 in its opening week for a total gross of $2,414,475 by the end of its theatrical run. It was released in other cinemas worldwide which contributed to a total gross of $2,777,947.

References

External links 

Captain Sabertooth and the Magic Diamond at TV 2 (in Norwegian)

Films directed by Rasmus A. Sivertsen